The Monastery of Saint Paraskevi is an abandoned monastery situated on the edge of Vikos Gorge, in the region of Zagori (Ioannina regional unit), northwestern Greece. The monastery founded at 1413–1414, consists of a small stone-built chapel, the oldest preserved in Zagori, and offers panoramic views to the gorge.

Foundation and description
The monastery, named after Saint Paraskevi ( Aghia Paraskevi), was founded at 1413–1414. According to an inscription over its gate, the foundation took place when the local ruler of Epirus was Despot Carlo I Tocco. It was built by the inhabitants of the nearby village of Vitsa and with the personal expense of a local lord, the voevoda Michael Therianos. Tradition mentions that Therianos built the monastery as an act of thanksgiving for his daughter's savior suffering from an incurable illness.

The church is a small basilica, with only a nave and a wooden roof, surrounded by the monks' cells. The frescoes of the temple partially date to 15th century. On the northern wall, there is a donor portrait of Therianos, his wife and children. The depictions are indicative of the dressing code of that time. The outfits of the benefactors are luxurious with rich embroidered cloths, broad braids and fringes. His daughter, Theodora, is wearing a white kerchief on her head, which is wrapped around her neck. The wall paintings on the south wall are dated from the relevant inscription around 1689.

Surroundings
The monastery is built at the edge of a rough rock that stands over the Vikos Gorge. The closest village, Monodendri, is a 15-minute walk away. From the terrace of the chapel, which has been appropriately designed, visitors can safely watch over the gorge.

A number of caves are located in the middle of the rough side of Vikos north and east of the monastery, where hermits and persecuted Christians sought refuge during Ottoman times. Moreover, for the same reason, a number of small dwellings were built around 1816.

References

Religious buildings and structures completed in 1414
Byzantine church buildings in Epirus (region)
Christian monasteries established in the 15th century
Saint Paraskevi
Despotate of Epirus
Religious organizations established in the 1410s
Zagori
1413 establishments in Europe
1414 establishments in Europe
Buildings and structures in Ioannina (regional unit)
15th-century churches in Greece